Willow Grove, also known as the Clark House,  is a historic plantation house located near Madison Mills, Orange County, Virginia. The main brick section was built about 1848, and is connected to a frame wing dated to about 1787.  The main section is a -story, six-bay, Greek Revival-style brick structure on a high basement.  The front facade features a massive, -story, tetrastyle pedimented portico with Tuscan order columns, a full Tuscan entablature, an arched brick podium, and Chinese lattice railings.  Also on the property are numerous 19th-century dependencies and farm buildings, including a two-story schoolhouse, a one-story weaving house, a smokehouse, and a frame-and-stone barn and stable.

It was listed on the National Register of Historic Places in 1979.

References

Plantation houses in Virginia
Houses on the National Register of Historic Places in Virginia
Greek Revival houses in Virginia
Houses completed in 1848
Houses in Orange County, Virginia
National Register of Historic Places in Orange County, Virginia
U.S. Route 15